Thomas Clerke was a Sunderland singer/songwriter and poet from the seventeenth and/or eighteenth century.

Thomas Clerke was said to be a “Gentleman of powerful convivial talents and the author of several spirited, and Anacreontic¹ songs” many of which are now attributed to others.

He was said to be always cheerful and an outgoing member of society. His works were poetical and full of ready wit and sparkling humour.

His works include :-
 Sons of the Wear
 Musical Club
 Ode to Silver Street
 Spottee – appears in The Bishoprick Garland by (Sir) Cuthbert Sharp and also A Beuk o’ Newcassell Sangs by Joseph Crawhall.
 ’Tis all that I desire (actual title unknown) – an extract of which appears in The Bishoprick Garland.

¹ Anacreontic = in the manner of the Greek lyric poet Anacreon (?572–?488 BC), noted for his short songs celebrating love and wine - or (of verse) in praise of love or wine; amatory or convivial

See also 
Geordie dialect words
Cuthbert Sharp
The Bishoprick Garland 1834 by Sharp

References

External links
 The Bishoprick Garland 1834 by (Sir) Cuthbert Sharp page 50

English male poets
English male singer-songwriters
People from Sunderland
Writers from Tyne and Wear
Geordie songwriters